Claes Hultling (born ) is a Swedish wheelchair curler.

Teams

References

External links 

Living people
1953 births
Swedish male curlers
Swedish wheelchair curlers
Swedish disabled sportspeople